The N.W.A Legacy, Vol. 2 is a compilation of tracks from original members of the iconic gangsta rap group N.W.A; Ice Cube, Eazy-E, Dr. Dre, MC Ren, and DJ Yella, as well as artists that were spawned by members of the group, such as Tha Dogg Pound, Bone Thugs-n-Harmony, and Tha Eastsidaz.  Some other tracks are collaborations or songs by associates of the foursome, such as The D.O.C. and D.J. Quik.  It is the second album in the series.  Songs were originally from various labels, including Ruthless Records, Def Jam, Tommy Boy and Death Row Records. Mark Copeland executive produced the album.

Track listing

Critical reception
{{Album reviews
| rev1 = AllMusic 
|rev1Score = <ref name="AllMusic">{{AllMusic |class=album |id=the-nwa-legacy-vol-2-mw0000661450 |tab= |label=The N.W.A. Legacy, Vol. 2 |last=Fennessy |first=Kathleen C. |accessdate=25 December 2017}}</ref>
}}

Kathleen C. Fennessy of AllMusic believed The N.W.A. Legacy, Vol. 2'' was an introductory sample of future re-releases by Priority Records.

References

N.W.A albums
West Coast hip hop compilation albums
2002 compilation albums
Albums produced by Daz Dillinger
Albums produced by DJ Quik
Albums produced by Dr. Dre
Ruthless Records compilation albums
Gangsta rap compilation albums
G-funk compilation albums
Priority Records compilation albums